Tan Ser Cher is a weightlifter from Singapore who began full-time training in the sport when he was 16, and was crowned the "Champion of Champions" in the local weightlifting competition in 1954 at the age of 21. He represented Singapore in the 1956 Summer Olympics in Melbourne, Australia in his first international competition, and came in at 7th position. 

In 1955, Tan won his first international title at a triangle meet (Singapore, Malaysia and Indonesia) in Singapore with a weight of 655 lbs. In 1956, he won silver medal at a 4 nation-meet (Singapore, Malaysia, Indonesia and China) with a weight of 655.5 lbs.

In 1958, Tan reached the 4th position at the 3rd Asian Games held in Tokyo, Japan. Two months later, he achieved the gold medal at the 1958 British Empire and Commonwealth Games in the featherweight category after hoisting 685 lbs. Tan then retire from weightlifting due to an injury to his back.

However, in 1959, he was asked to represent Singapore in the 1st SEAP Games in Bangkok, Thailand. He won a bronze medal in the featherweight division and retired permanently from weightlifting.

References

External links
 
Hall of Fame - Tan Ser Cher

Singaporean male weightlifters
Singaporean people of Chinese descent
Weightlifters at the 1956 Summer Olympics
Olympic weightlifters of Singapore
Commonwealth Games gold medallists for Singapore
Weightlifters at the 1958 British Empire and Commonwealth Games
Living people
Commonwealth Games medallists in weightlifting
Year of birth missing (living people)
Weightlifters at the 1958 Asian Games
Asian Games competitors for Singapore
Medallists at the 1958 British Empire and Commonwealth Games